Huixian or Hui Xian may refer to:

Places in China
Huixian, a county-level city in Henan
Hui County, or Huixian, a county in Gansu
Huixian, Guangxi (会仙), a town in Guilin, Guangxi

Others
Hui Xian REIT, a RMB-denominated real estate investment trust based in Hong Kong
Xian Hui (born 1958), or Hui Xian in the Western name order, Chinese politician